This is a list of the oldest-known trees, as reported in reliable sources. Definitions of what constitutes an individual tree vary. In addition, tree ages are derived from a variety of sources, including documented "tree-ring" (dendrochronological) count core samples, and from estimates. For these reasons, this article presents three lists of "oldest trees," each using varying criteria.

There are three tables of trees, which are listed by age and species. The first table includes trees for which a minimum age has been directly determined, either through counting or cross-referencing tree rings or through radiocarbon dating. Many of these trees may be even older than their listed ages, but the oldest wood in the tree has rotted away. For some old trees, so much of the center is missing that their age cannot be directly determined. Instead, estimates are made based on the tree's size and presumed growth rate. The second table includes trees with these estimated ages. The last table lists clonal colonies in which no individual tree trunks may be remarkably old but in which the organism as a whole is thought to be very old.

The current record-holders for individual, non-clonal trees are the Great Basin bristlecone pine trees from California and Nevada, in the United States. Through tree-ring cross-referencing, they have been shown to be almost five millennia old.

A clonal colony can survive for much longer than an individual tree. A colony of 48,000 quaking aspen trees (nicknamed Pando), covering  in the Fishlake National Forest of Utah, is considered one of the oldest and largest organisms in the world. Recent estimates set the colony's age at several thousand (up to 14,000) years, although tree ring samples date individual stems at rarely more than 130 years. A colony of Huon pine trees covering  on Mount Read (Tasmania) is estimated to be around 10,000 years old, as determined by DNA samples taken from pollen collected from the sediment of a nearby lake. Individual trees in this group date to no more than 4,000 years old, as determined by tree ring samples.

Trees with verified ages

Trees with estimated ages
Note: The ages of the trees in this list are speculative and only serve as estimates.

Clonal trees
As with all long-lived plant and fungal species, no individual part of a clonal colony is alive (in the sense of active metabolism) for more than a very small fraction of the life of the entire clone. Some clonal colonies may be fully connected via their root systems, while most are not actually interconnected, but are genetically identical clones which populated an area through vegetative reproduction. Ages for clonal colonies, often based on current growth rates, are estimates.

See also

King Clone
List of largest giant sequoias
List of longest-living organisms
List of old-growth forests
List of individual trees
List of superlative trees
Oldest viable seed
Veteran tree

Notes

References

Lists of trees
Trees